McPherson's Mood is the sixth album led by saxophonist Charles McPherson recorded in 1969 and released on the Prestige label.

Reception

Allmusic awarded the album 4 stars with its review by Alex Henderson stating, "McPherson's Mood isn't the least bit innovative (by 1969 standards), but it's definitely solid and enjoyable".

Track listing 
All compositions by Charles McPherson except as indicated
 "Explorations" - 5:22  
 "McPherson's Mood" - 8:12  
 "Opalescence" - 5:37  
 "My Cherie Amour" (Henry Cosby, Sylvia Moy, Stevie Wonder) - 8:23  
 "Mish-Mash-Bash" - 6:58  
 "I Get a Kick Out of You" (Cole Porter) - 6:47

Personnel 
Charles McPherson - alto saxophone
Barry Harris - piano
Buster Williams - bass
Roy Brooks - drums

References 

Charles McPherson (musician) albums
1970 albums
Prestige Records albums
Albums produced by Don Schlitten